Valgeranna is a village in Audru Parish, Pärnu County, in southwestern Estonia. It is located just south of Audru, the administrative centre of the municipality, on the coast of Pärnu Bay (part of the Gulf of Riga). The city of Pärnu is located 7 km east. Valgeranna has a population of 19 (as of 1 January 2011).

References

Villages in Pärnu County